Galia may refer to:

People

Given name 
Galia Ackerman (born 1948), French-Russian writer and translator
Galia Angelova (born 1972), Bulgarian tennis player
Galia Dvorak (born 1988), Spanish table tennis player
Galia Moss, Mexican adventurer
Galia Sabar (born 1963), Israeli professor
Galia Solomonoff (born 1968), Argentinian-born architect and creative director
Galia Yishai (1950-2020), Israeli actress

Surname 
Jean Galia (1905-1949), a French rugby footballer
Martin Galia (born 1979), Czech handball player
Roberto Galia (born 1963), Italian football player and coach

Places
Gália, a municipality in the state of São Paulo, Brazil
Galia, Greece, a village on the island of Crete, Greece
Ge'alya, a moshav in Israel
Nueva Galia, a village in Argentina

Other uses
Galia (melon), a type of melon similar to a cantaloupe
Galia, the name of the Queen Amanoa character in the fictional Star Wars Expanded Universe
Galia (film), a 1966 film directed by Georges Lautner
Galia Lahav, Israeli fashion label

See also
Gallia
Ğäliä, a madrasa in Ufa.